The Central Electricity Generating Board (CEGB) was responsible for electricity generation, transmission and bulk sales in England and Wales from 1958 until privatisation of the electricity industry in the 1990s.

It was established on 1 January 1958 to assume the functions of the Central Electricity Authority (1955–7), which had in turn replaced the British Electricity Authority (1948–55). The Electricity Council was also established in January 1958, as the coordinating and policy-making body for the British electricity supply industry.

Responsibilities 

The CEGB was responsible for electricity generation, transmission and bulk sales in England and Wales, whilst in Scotland electricity generation was carried out by the South of Scotland Electricity Board and the North of Scotland Hydro-Electric Board.

The CEGB's duty was to develop and maintain an efficient, coordinated and economical system of supply of electricity in bulk for England and Wales, and for that purpose to generate or acquire supplies of electricity and to provide bulk supplies of electricity for the area electricity boards for distribution. It also had power to supply bulk electricity to the Scottish boards or electricity undertakings outside Great Britain.

The organisation was unusual in that most of its senior staff were professional engineers, supported in financial and risk-management areas.

Corporate structure

Background 
In 1954, six years after nationalisation, the Government appointed the Herbert Committee to examine the efficiency and organisation of the electricity industry. The committee found that the British Electricity Authority's dual roles of electricity generation and supervision had led to central concentration of responsibility and to duplication between headquarters and divisional staff which led to delays in the commissioning of new stations. The Committee's recommendations were enacted by the Electricity Act 1957 which established the Electricity Council to oversee the industry and the CEGB with responsibility for generation and transmission.

Constitution

The CEGB was established by section 2 of the Electricity Act 1957. It consisted of a Generating Board comprising a chairman and seven to nine full-time or part-time members, appointed by the Minister of Power, who had experience or capacity in "the generation or supply of electricity, industrial, commercial or financial matters, applied science, administration, or the organisation of workers". The power of appointment later devolved to the Minister of Technology, then to the Secretary of State for Trade and Industry.

There were six chairmen of the CEGB:

 Christopher Hinton, Baron Hinton of Bankside, served from 1957 to 1964,
 Sir Stanley Brown served from 1965 to 1972, 
 Sir Arthur Hawkins from 1972 to 1977, 
 Glyn England from 1977 to 1982,
 Walter Marshall, Baron Marshall of Goring from 1982 to 1989,
 Gil Blackman was appointed chairman in January 1989 until 1990.

The executive comprised the chairman and the full-time board members. The Headquarters Operations Department provided a service to the board and executive and could supply specialist staff.

The chairman and two other members of the board plus the chairmen of the area boards were members of the Electricity Council.

Organisation 
The design, construction and development functions associated with power stations and transmission was undertaken by two divisions: the Generation Development and Construction Division based in Cheltenham and then Barnwood Gloucester, and the Transmission Development and Construction Division based in Guildford. In 1979 the Transmission Division had been restructured as the Transmission and Technical Services Division based in Guildford, and a Technology Planning and Research Division based in London, the latter was formed from the Research Division System Technical and Generation Studies Branches.

A Corporate Strategy Department was formed in 1981 from some of the Planning Department. A Nuclear Operations Support Group was also formed in 1981 to provide expert support.

The sculpture "Power in Trust" from the CEGB logo was made by Norman Sillman to represent a hand made from boiler pipes and a turbine, it was commissioned in the 1961 for the opening of Staythorpe B Power Station.

When first constituted the CEGB's London headquarters was at the former Central Electricity Authority's building in Winsley Street W1, there were also offices in Buchanan House, 24/30 Holborn, London, EC1.

Employees 
There were a total of 131,178 employees in the electricity supply industry 1989, composed as follows:

Infrastructure 
The CEGB spent more on industrial construction than any other organisation in the UK. In 1958 about 40 power stations were being planned or constructed at a capital cost of £800 million.

Power stations 
Those public supply power stations that were in operation at any time between 1958 and 1990 were owned and operated by the CEGB. In 1971–2 there were 183 power stations on 156 sites, with an installed capacity of 58,880.051 MW, and supplied 190,525 GWh. By 1981–2 there were 108 power stations with a capacity of 55,185 MW and supplied 210,289 GWh.

 Lists of power stations in the United Kingdom
 List of power stations in England
 List of power stations in Wales
 Nuclear power in the United Kingdom

National Grid 
At its inception the CEGB operated 2,763 circuit km of high-tension 275 kV supergrid. The growth of the high voltage National Grid over the lifetime of the CEGB is demonstrated in the following table.

Substations

In 1981–2 there was a total of 203 substations operating at 275/400 kV, these sub-stations included 570 transformers operating at 275/400 kV.

Operations

Control of generation and the National Grid 
At the centre of operations was the National Control Centre of the National Grid in London, which was part of the control hierarchy for the system. The National Control Centre was based in Bankside House from 1962. There were also both area and district Grid Control Areas, which were originally at Newcastle upon Tyne, Leeds, Manchester, Nottingham, Birmingham, St Albans, East Grinstead and Bristol. The shift control engineers who worked in these control centres would cost, schedule and load-dispatch an economic commitment of generation to the main interconnected system (the 400/275/132kV network) at an adequate level of security. They also had information about the running costs and availability of every power producing plant in England and Wales. They constantly anticipated demand, monitored and instructed power stations to increase, reduce or stop electricity production. They used the "merit order", a ranking of each generator in power stations based upon how much they cost to produce electricity. The objective was to ensure that electricity production and transmission was achieved at the lowest possible cost.

In 1981 the three-tier corporate transmission structure: National Control, area control rooms in the regions, and district control rooms (areas) was changed to a two-tier structure by merging the area and district control rooms.

Electricity supplies and sales 
The electricity generated, supplied and sold by the CEGB, in GWh, was as follows:

Note: imports are bulk supplies from the South of Scotland and France and from private sources, exports are bulk supplies to the South of Scotland and France.

Financial statistics 
A summary of the income and expenditure of the CEGB (in £ million) is as follows:

Regions
Detailed control of operational matters such planning, electricity generation, transmission and maintenance were delegated to five geographical regions. From January 1971 each region had a director-general, a director of generation, a director of operational planning, a director of transmission, a financial controller, a controller of scientific services and a personnel nanager.

Midlands Region
Regional headquarters: Haslucks Green Road, Shirley, Solihull, West Midlands.

The Midlands Region was responsible for the operation of 38 power stations, over 170 sub-stations and nearly 2,000 miles of grid transmission line in an area that covered 11,000 square miles. The region produced more than a quarter of the electricity used in England and Wales and had a major share of the industrial construction programme mounted by the CEGB during the 1960s.

In 1948 the total generating capacity of all the power stations in the region was 2,016 MW only a little more than a modern 2,000 MW station. By 1957 the region's capacity was up to 4,000 MW, doubling to 8,000 MW by 1966 and rising to 14,000 MW in 1969 and 16,000 MW by 1971.

Previous chairmen of the Midlands Region were Arthur Hawkins, Gilbert Blackman, and R. L. Batley.

Prior to 1968 the Midlands Region was divided into the West Midlands Division and the East Midlands Division. The number of power stations, installed capacity and electricity supplied in the Midlands Region was:

North Eastern Region
Regional Headquarters: Merrion Centre, Leeds (1971). Beckwith Knowle, Otley Road, Harrogate.

Extending through Northumberland, Durham, Yorkshire and North Lincolnshire the North Eastern Region was responsible for the operation of 32 power stations capable of producing 8,000 MW of electricity. 108 substations and over 1,200 route miles of overhead lines transmitted the electricity to the Yorkshire Electricity Board and the North Eastern Electricity Board for passing onto the customer.

A previous chairman of the North Eastern Region was P.J. Squire.

Prior to 1968 the North Eastern Region was divided into the Northern Division and the Yorkshire Division.The number of power stations, installed capacity and electricity supplied in the North Eastern Region was:

North Western Region
Regional Headquarters: 825 Wilmslow Road, Manchester, M20 (1971). Europa House, Bird Hall Lane, Cheadle Heath, Stockport.

Previous chairman of the North Western Region were J.L. Ashworth and G.B. Jackson.

The number of power stations, installed capacity and electricity supplied in the North Western Region was:

South Eastern Region
Regional Headquarters: Bankside House, Summer Street, London.

Past chairman of the South Eastern Region were G.N. Stone, H.J. Bennett and F.W. Skelcher.

Prior to 1968 the South Eastern Region was divided into the North Thames Division and the South Thames Division. The number of power stations, installed capacity and electricity supplied in the South Eastern Region was:

South Western Region
Regional Headquarters: 15–23 Oakfield Grove, Clifton, Bristol (1971). Bedminster Down, Bridgwater Road, Bristol.

Previous chairman of the South Western Region were Douglas Pask, Roy Beatt, A.C. Thirtle and R.H. Coates.

Prior to 1968 the South Western Region was divided into the Southern Division, the Western Division and the South Wales Division. The number of power stations, installed capacity and electricity supplied in the South Western Region was:

Supplies to area boards 
The supplies of electricity from the CEGB Regions to the area electricity boards in 1971–2 and 1981–2 were as follows. The average charge in 1971–2 was 0.6519 pence/kWh, in 1981–2 the charge was 3.0615 pence/kWh.

During the lifetime of the CEGB peak demand had more than doubled from 19,311 MW in 1958 to 47,925 MW in 1987. Sales of electricity had increased from 79.7 TWh in 1958 to 240 TWh in 1988.

Research and development
The CEGB had an extensive R&D section with its three principal laboratories at Leatherhead (Central Electricity Research Laboratories, CERL) (opened by the Minister of Power in May 1962), Marchwood Engineering Laboratory (MEL), and Berkeley Nuclear Laboratories (BNL). There were also five regional facilities and four project groups, North, South, Midlands and the Transmission Project Group. These scientific service departments (SSD) had a base in each region. A major SSD role was solving engineering problems with the several designs of 500 MW units. These were a significant increase in unit size and had many teething problems, most of which were solved to result in reliable service and gave good experience towards the design of the 660 MW units.

In the 1970s and 1980s, for the real-time control of power stations the R&D team developed the Cutlass programming language and application system. After privatisation, CUTLASS systems in National Power were phased out and replaced largely with Advanced Plant Management System (APMS) – a SCADA solution developed in partnership by RWE npower (a descendant company of CEGB) and Thales UK. APMS itself has since become obsolete. However, Eggborough was the last station, particularly unit 2; fully operated using APMS until its decommissioning in 2017.

In contrast, PowerGen, later taken over by E.ON (which further split to form Uniper), undertook a programme to port the entire system to current hardware. The most current version of Cutlass, 'PT-Cutlass Kit 9', runs on Motorola PPC-based hardware, with the engineering workstation and administrative functions provided by a standard Microsoft Windows PC. It is fully compatible (with a few minor exceptions) with the DEC PDP-11 version (kit 1) released by PowerGen and has a high level of compatibility with the final version of kit 1 formerly used at National Power. It is used at three UK power stations: Ratcliffe-on-Soar, Cottam, and Fiddlers Ferry.

Policies and strategies 
The CEGB was subject to examination from external bodies and formed policies and strategies to meet its responsibilities.

External 
A 1978 government white paper Re-organisation of the Electricity Supply in England and Wales proposed the creation of an Electricity Corporation to unify the fragmented structure of the industry. Parliamentary constraints prevented its enactment.

A report by the Monopolies and Mergers Commission, Central Electricity Generating Board: a Report on the Operation by the Board of its system for the generation and supply of Electricity in bulk was published in 1981. The report found that the CEGB's operations were efficient but that their investment appraisal operated against the public interest.

Internal 
In 1964 the CEGB chose the Advanced Gas-cooled Reactor, developed by the United Kingdom Atomic Energy Authority, for a programme of new station construction. The five stations were: Dungeness B, Hinkley Point B, Hartlepool, Heysham and Hunterston B.

In 1976 the CEGB introduced an accelerated power station closure programme. On 25 October 23 power stations were closed and 18 partly closed, with a combined capacity of 2,884 MW. Six further stations with a capacity of 649 MW were closed in March 1977.

In 1979 the CEGB and the National Coal Board entered a joint understanding that the CEGB would endeavour to take 75 million tonnes of coal per year to 1985 provided the pithead price did not increase above the rate of inflation.

In 1981 the CEGB applied for planning consent to build a 1,200 MW pressurized water reactor at Sizewell. There was a lengthy public inquiry.

In 1981 the CEGB introduced another accelerated power station closure programme. On 26 October 16 power stations were closed with a combined capacity of 3,402 MW. A further 1,320 MW of capacity was maintained unmanned in reserve.

Privatisation
The electricity market in the UK was built upon the break-up of the CEGB into four companies in the 1990s. Its generation (or upstream) activities were transferred to three generating companies, 'PowerGen', 'National Power', and 'Nuclear Electric' (later 'British Energy', eventually 'EDF Energy'); and its transmission (or downstream) activities to the 'National Grid Company'.

The shares in National Grid were distributed to the regional electricity companies prior to their own privatisation in 1990. PowerGen and National Power were privatised in 1991, with 60% stakes in each company sold to investors, the remaining 40% being held by the UK government. The privatisation process was initially delayed as it was concluded that the 'earlier decided nuclear power plant assets in National Power' would not be included in the private National Power. A new company was formed, Nuclear Electric, which would eventually own and operate the nuclear power assets, and the nuclear power stations were held in public ownership for a number of years.

In 1995, the government sold its 40% stakes, and the assets of Nuclear Electric and Scottish Nuclear were both combined and split. The combination process merged operations of UK's eight most advanced nuclear plants – seven Advanced Gas Cooled Reactor (AGR) and one Pressurised Water Reactor (PWR) – into a new private company founded in 1996, 'British Energy' (now 'EDF Energy'). The splitting process created a separate company in 1996 called 'Magnox Electric' to hold the older Magnox reactors, later combined with BNFL.

Although electricity privatisation began in 1990, the CEGB continued to exist until the Central Electricity Generating Board (Dissolution) Order 2001, a statutory instrument, came into force on 9 November 2001.

Powergen is now E.ON UK, owned by the German utility company E.ON, who then further split to form Uniper, who own the majority of the former E.On conventional power generation. National Power split into a UK business, 'Innogy', now 'RWE npower', owned by the German utility company RWE, and an international business, 'International Power', now Engie Energy International and owned by the French company Engie.

Arms

Publications 

Nuclear Know-How! – with an element of truth. Published by the Central Electricity Generating Board Publicity Services – South East, Bankside House, Sumner Street, London SE1 9JU (n.d. but published c. 1980s–1990s). 20 pages.
Central Electricity Generating Board, Annual Report and Accounts (published annually).
Central Electricity Generating Board, Statistical Yearbook (published annually).
H.R. Johnson et al., The Mechanism of Corrosion by Fuel Impurities (Central Electricity Generating Board; Marchwood Engineering Laboratories, 1963).
Central Electricity Research Laboratories, Symposium on chimney plume rise and dispersion, Atmospheric Environment (1967) 1, 351–440.
Central Electricity Generating Board, Modern Power Station Practice, 5 volumes (Oxford, Pergamon Press, 1971).
Central Electricity Generating Board, How Electricity Is Made and Transmitted (CEGB, London, 1972).
 Central Electricity Generating Board, Submission to the Commission on Energy and the Environment (CEGB, London 1981).
Central Electricity Generating Board, Acid Rain (London, CEGB, 1984).
 Central Electricity Generating Board, Achievements in technology, planning and research (CEGB, London, 1985).
 Central Electricity Generating Board, Advances in Power Station Construction (Oxford, Pergamon Press, 1986).
Central Electricity Generating Board, European Year of the Environment: the CEGB Achievements (CEGB, London, 1986).
 Central Electricity Generating Board, Drax Power Station, Proposed Flue Gas Desulphurisation Plant (London, CEGB, 1988).

See also
Timeline of the UK electricity supply industry
Energy policy of the United Kingdom
Energy in the United Kingdom

References

External links 
 

1957 establishments in the United Kingdom
2001 disestablishments in the United Kingdom
Companies based in the London Borough of Camden
Electric power companies of the United Kingdom
Electric power generation in the United Kingdom
Former nationalised industries of the United Kingdom
Government agencies established in 1957
Government agencies disestablished in 2001
History of the London Borough of Camden
National Grid (Great Britain)